Juha Dahllund (born 20 March 1954) is a Finnish former footballer. He competed in the men's tournament at the 1980 Summer Olympics. Most of his career he played for Helsingin Jalkapalloklubi.

References

External links
 

1954 births
Living people
Finnish footballers
Finland international footballers
Olympic footballers of Finland
Footballers at the 1980 Summer Olympics
Footballers from Helsinki
Association football midfielders
FC Kiffen 08 players
Helsingin Jalkapalloklubi players
20th-century Finnish people